The discography of the Beautiful South, an English pop/rock group, consists of ten studio albums, five greatest hits compilations, thirty-four singles and a number of other appearances.

Albums

Studio albums

Compilation albums

Singles

Music videos

References

Discographies of British artists
Rock music group discographies